The women's doubles squash event at the 2019 Pan American Games will be held from July 26th – July 28th at the CAR Voleibol en la Videna in Lima, Peru. 

Each National Olympic Committee could enter a maximum of one pair into the competition. The athletes will be drawn into an elimination stage draw. Once a pair lost a match, they will be no longer able to compete. Each match will be contested as the best of three games.

Results

Bracket

References

External links
Results

Women's doubles